Pyrausta demantrialis is a moth in the family Crambidae. It was described by Herbert Druce in 1895. It is found in the United States, where it has been recorded from Arizona, Florida, Indiana, Michigan, New Mexico, North Carolina, Pennsylvania, Texas and West Virginia. It has also been recorded from Mexico (Guerrero), Ecuador (Loja Province) and Venezuela.

Adults have been recorded on wing from June to November in the United States.

References

Moths described in 1895
demantrialis
Moths of North America
Moths of South America